Alex Small-Butera (born January 29, 1986) and Lindsay Caroline Small-Butera (born September 16, 1985), sometimes collectively referred to as SMALLBÜ, are an American husband and wife animating duo. They are best known for creating the long running web series Baman Piderman. They have also famously worked on Adventure Time and helped co-develop the video game Later Alligator.

Biography 
Alex Butera and Lindsay Small met at Massachusetts College of Art and Design. They collaborated on a homework assignment to create a short film for the Ottawa International Animation Festival in Canada. The result was the surreal animated comedy Baman Piderman. The short was released online where it became a hit. Following this, they launched a Kickstarter campaign to have a full web series developed. Mondo Media eventually bought the series for their YouTube channel. Initially, Alex was the sole person working on the shorts, but after showing the third episode to Lindsay, she stated that it was "the worst thing [she] had ever seen." Alex asked her to become the writer for the series. She had refused at first, but since then all of their work had been equally divided between the two. Alex started working on the series WordGirl while Lindsay worked as a designer for Converse before working at Hero4Hire Creative animation.

They did guest work on the long running Cartoon Network series Adventure Time. Lindsay Small-Butera earned an Emmy Award for her work on the episode "Ketchup". In 2019, they helped create the animation for the point-and-click indie game Later Alligator which took "40,000 cels" to animate.

Influences 
Alex was influenced by popular anime such as Ghost in the Shell, Cowboy Bebop and FLCL, while Lindsay has cited UPA as her source of inspiration along with classic 50's animation.

Filmography

References

External links 

1985 births
1986 births
Living people
Filmmaking duos
American television directors
American animators
Animation people
American animated film directors
American women animators
American women television directors